Harald Ricardo Beyer Burgos (born April 2, 1964) is a Chilean economist and researcher. Former member of the Presidential Advisory Councils of Education under the government of Michelle Bachelet. He served as Minister of Education of Chile from December 29, 2011 to April 17, 2013 when he was impeached because of his failure to address for-profit activity in universities (which is illegal). He subsequently became executive director of the Centro de Estudios Públicos, a right-wing think tank in Santiago under the presidency of Eliodoro Matte. He is now vice-chancellor of the Adolfo Ibáñez University.

References

1964 births
Living people
Chilean politicians
Chilean Ministers of Education
University of Chile alumni
University of California, Los Angeles alumni
Evópoli politicians
People from Osorno, Chile
Impeached officials removed from office
Impeached Chilean officials